Santa Rita do Araguaia is a municipality in southwestern Goiás state, Brazil.

Location
Santa Rita is located on the Araguaia River and is connected to the state capital, Goiânia by highway BR-364.  It is 91 kilometers west of regional center, Mineiros.  The distance to state capital, Goiânia is 516 km.  Highway connections are made from Goiânia by BR-060 / Abadia de Goiás / Guapó / Indiara / Acreúna / Rio Verde / Jataí / GO-050 / BR-364 / Mineiros / BR-384. Sepin

Municipal boundaries are with:  
north and west:  Mato Grosso
south and west:  Mineiros

History
The origin of Santa Rita do Araguaia, located on the right bank of the Rio Araguaia, opposite the city of Alto Araguaia in Mato Grosso, was the Araguaia ranch, bought in 1854 by José Manoel Vilela.  He reserved a large area for a settlement called Santa Rita dos Impossíveis.  Later the name was changed to Santa Rita do Araguaia.  In 1911 it became a district in the municipality of Mineiros.   In 1943 the name was changed to "Ivapé", an Indigenous word meaning "road of fruit".  In 1953 the town became a municipality with its present name.

Political and Demographic Information
Mayor: Luzia Ferreira Costa e Santos (January 2005)
City council: 09
Eligible voters: 3,674 (2007)
Population density: 4.31 inhabitants/km2 (2005)
Urban population: 5,146 (2007)
Rural population: 727 (2007)
Geometric Growth Rate:  2.07% for 2000/2007

Economic Information
The economy is based on subsistence agriculture, cattle raising, services, public administration, and small transformation industries.  
Industrial units: 2 (2007)
Commercial units: 64 (2007)
Financial institutions: 01 branch of Bradesco S.A. (May/2006)
Automobiles: 653  (2007)
Cattle herd: 53,500 head (4,900 milk cows)
Main crops: rice, sugarcane, bananas, corn (3,550 hectares), and soybeans (5,000).

Education (2006) and Health (2007)
Schools: 5 with 1,737 students
Higher education: none
Adult literacy rate: 85.9% (2000) (national average was 86.4%)
Hospitals: 0
Hospital beds: 0
Ambulatory clinics: 1
Infant mortality rate: 20.02 (2000) (national average was 33.0)

Municipal Human Development Index
MHDI: 0.756
Ranking in the state:  65 out of 242 municipalities
National ranking:  1706 out of 5507 municipalities

Data are from 2000

For the complete list see Frigoletto.com

See also 
List of municipalities in Goiás
Microregions of Goiás

References

Frigoletto
 Sepin

Municipalities in Goiás